Dairyland is an unincorporated community in Madera County, California. Dairyland was at one terminus of the Chowchilla Pacific Railroad, and at a terminus of a branch of the Southern Pacific Railroad.

Education
The Alview-Dairyland Union School District is the local elementary school district.

References

Unincorporated communities in California
Unincorporated communities in Madera County, California